Joshua (Josh) Liam Auty (born 8 September 1990) in Mirfield, West Yorkshire, is a British speedway rider.

Career
On 10 September 2007, Auty was signed to the Coventry Bees to ride in the Elite League. On 21 September 2007, Auty was selected to represent Great Britain for the 2007 Under 21-World Cup Final. Auty was Conference League Rider's championship runner up in 2007, held at Rye House, losing out to his Scunthorpe teammate Tai Woffinden.

On 4 December 2008, Auty was signed on a loan deal from Coventry to Sheffield Tigers. In November 2011 he signed for Scunthorpe Scorpions for the 2012 Premier League season.

In 2010 Auty rode the off-season in Australia where he won the Queensland State Championship at the North Brisbane Speedway, as well as the Jack Young Solo Cup at the Gillman Speedway in Adelaide.

Auty was included in the Elite League draft for the 2015 season and picked by Leicester Lions. He was again selected for the Lions for 2016.

After struggling in the SGB Premiership for Lions, Auty was dropped, and continued to ride in the SGB Championship for Scorpions until announcing his retirement from the sport at the end of May. He reversed his decision, however, a few days later; and spent the 2018 season riding for the Scunthorpe Scorpions. He continued to ride for Scunthorpe during the 2019 and 2021 seasons.

In 2022, he re-joined and rode for the Birmingham Brummies in the SGB Championship 2022.

References 

1990 births
Living people
British speedway riders
English motorcycle racers
Birmingham Brummies riders
Leicester Lions riders
Redcar Bears riders
Scunthorpe Scorpions riders
Sheffield Tigers riders